Jiaoshan (Jiāoshān) is a mountain in the city of Zhenjiang, in southwestern Jiangsu Province, People's Republic of China. It lies next to the Yangtze River.

History
The area takes its name from Jiao Guang, who lived in the area in the 3rd century during the final years of the Han dynasty.

The Buddhist Dinghui Temple (also known as the Shanguo Temple), is located in Jiaoshan.

Chinese steles
Jiaoshan is home to a large collection of more than four hundred ancient stone Chinese stele tablets — known as the Baomo Xuan and Jiaoshan Beilin. One of the stele, the Yihe Ming was inscribed by the Han-era "Sage of Calligraphy" Wang Xizhi. These are a Major National Historical and Cultural Site in Jiangsu.

References

Official Government Website 

Zhenjiang
Chinese steles
Major National Historical and Cultural Sites in Jiangsu
AAAA-rated tourist attractions
Tourist attractions in Jiangsu
Jiangsu articles missing geocoordinate data